Breakfast (also referred to as 1 News Breakfast) is a New Zealand morning news and talk show airing weekday mornings on TVNZ 1, produced by 1 News. Debuting on 11 August 1997, it was the first of its genre in New Zealand. It contains a mixture of breaking news, news, sport, weather and feature items. Originally a two-hour programme, it was expanded to three hours in 2012. It is currently presented by Jenny-May Clarkson, Matty Mclean, Anna Burns-Francis and Chris Chang.

History
Breakfast began airing on 11 August 1997 on TV One and was preceded by Telstra Business, an early morning programme devoted to business and finance. The original presenters were Susan Wood and Mike Hosking, with Liz Gunn as newsreader and Michael Wilson as presenter of Telstra Business.

Before Breakfast came along, breakfast television was introduced to Channel 2 in November 1989 with an early morning news service called Breakfast News with Tom Bradley as anchor and Penelope Barr as weather presenter. Breakfast News – which consisted of overnight stories, a business news summary and weather forecasts – aired on Channel 2 initially as a half hour bulletin at 7am with a five-minute news and weather update at 8am.

In 1990, the format of Breakfast News was changed to five-minute bulletins at 7am, 7.30am, 8am and 8.30am (during Channel 2's early morning programming for children) with former Top Half presenter John Hawkesby taking over as anchor. By August, John Hawkesby replaced Lindsay Perigo as co-anchor of the late night edition of One Network News and Breakfast News was axed by TVNZ.

When Breakfast began, its dominance was virtually unchallenged by the other networks until 2007, when TV3 launched Sunrise. Sunrise struggled against Breakfast in the ratings until Sunrise went off air because of financial issues in April 2010, leaving Breakfast as the only morning news and talk show in New Zealand, until TV3 launched their second attempt at a morning news programme, Firstline, in 2011.

Following Hosking's tenure, Breakfast was dominated by host Paul Henry's outspoken nature for serval years, until he resigned following a series of on-air racist comments in October 2010. Years later, Henry's self-titled breakfast show on TV3 caused a significant increase in Breakfast's competition from 2015. This resulted in Breakfast'''s relaunch in September 2016, with a new presenting line-up led by Hilary Barry and Jack Tame. Barry was moved to Seven Sharp from 2018, and was replaced on Breakfast by Hayley Holt. Holt resigned from the Green Party, who she had represented at the 2017 New Zealand general election, in order to take up the position. Tame remained on Breakfast until 2019, when he became the presenter of Q+A and was replaced by veteran New Zealand broadcaster John Campbell, who had recently joined TVNZ.

Between 23 March and 8 May 2020, the show was hosted by two rotating teams of three presenters due to the public health regulations around the COVID-19 pandemic. Campbell hosted with Pippa Wetzell and Melissa Stokes on Mondays and Tuesdays, with Jenny-May Clarkson (the show's regular newsreader), Hadyn Jones and Anna Burns-Francis taking over for the remaining episodes. Holt remained in self-isolation due to her pregnancy, while Matty McLean temporarily moved to present the weather for 1 News at 6pm. From 11 May the regular daily presenters returned, with Clarkson continuing as a main co-presenter until 2 June in Holt's absence. Holt left the show permanently in August, with Clarkson taking over her role. Indira Stewart subsequently joined the team as newsreader. During Auckland's lockdown period between 18 August and 12 November 2021, the two presenting teams were Campbell, Stewart and Stokes, and Clarkson, McLean and Jenny Suo.

On 31 January 2022, a new look for Breakfast was unveiled. This included a new augmented reality studio set and new graphics. McLean and Stewart's presenting roles were also increased. Campbell left the show in April to become TVNZ's special correspondent, and was briefly replaced by Kamahl Santamaria, who had previously presented for Al Jazeera English for 16 years.

In May 2022, Breakfast became the focus of media attention when Santamaria resigned from TVNZ after a month at the station. Santamaria's departure was initially described to his colleagues and the media as a "family emergency" or "personal matter", though the day after his resignation was announced it emerged that a female colleague had made a complaint against him over inappropriate behaviour. After further allegations of harassment against Santamaria during his time at Al Jazeera were reported, a review of TVNZ's hiring process was undertaken. Upon the review's completion in July 2022, TVNZ's head of news and current affairs, Paul Yurisich, who had hired Santamaria without thorough consultation, also resigned from his position.

In January 2023, TVNZ announced that New York Correspondent Anna Burns-Francis and sports presenter and former midday presenter Chris Chang would join the team in 2023 after the announcement that Indira Stewart was leaving to become a in-depth multimedia reporter for 1 News. However, she would present the midday bulletin on Fridays with Chang presenting Monday to Thursday.

Presenters

News anchor
 Neil Waka (2002)
 Peter Williams (2003–2016)
 Alison Mau (2008–2010)
 Rawdon Christie (2011–2012)
 Nadine Chalmers-Ross (2012–2015)
 Melissa Stokes (2015–2016)
 Daniel Faitaua (2016–2019)
 Jenny-May Clarkson (2019–2020)
 Indira Stewart (2020–2022)

Weather anchor
 Tāmati Coffey (2007–2012)
 Sam Wallace (2012–2016)
 Matty McLean (2017–2021)

 Reporters 
Breakfast reporters appear in live crosses throughout the three hour broadcast, and during news bulletins.

Saturday Breakfast

On 3 September 2011, TVNZ launched Saturday Breakfast'', which aired between 7 am and 9 am each Saturday. The programme was axed at the end of 2012 due to low viewership.

Format
Short news and sports updates are presented every half hour (6am, 6.30am, 7am, 7.30am, 8am and 8.30am) and followed by a weather forecast. Mostly, the programme has interviews with newsmakers or TVNZ reporters on the important headlines of the day. The first hour of the programme, from 6am, is usually devoted to news coverage and the rest of the programme has entertainment or special interest segments.

Awards
In 2014, TVNZ was awarded a Bravo award by the New Zealand Skeptics for coverage of the "dangers of Miracle Mineral Solution." And for their comment that MMS "is not a miracle cure for anything".

References

New Zealand television news shows
1990s New Zealand television series
2000s New Zealand television series
2010s New Zealand television series
2020s New Zealand television series
1997 New Zealand television series debuts
TVNZ 1 original programming
Breakfast television in New Zealand
New Zealand television talk shows
TVNZ original programming